Christopher Roy Sutton (born 10 March 1973) is an English former professional football player and manager. He later became a pundit and commentator for BT Sport, regularly working on their coverage of Scottish football. He is now also a pundit and occasional match co-commentator on BBC Radio 5 Live.

He played as a forward from 1991 to 2007 for Norwich City, Blackburn Rovers, Chelsea, Celtic, Birmingham City and Aston Villa. Sutton scored over 150 career goals in over 400 league appearances spanning 16 years in the English and Scottish Premier Leagues. He was capped once by England. He was also known as being one of the foremost exponents of the glancing header. He scored many goals with this technique which made him particularly effective from set-pieces.

In September 2009, Sutton was appointed manager of Lincoln City, but he resigned due to personal reasons twelve months later. In 2012, he came out of retirement briefly and featured for non-league Wroxham.

Playing career

Norwich City (1991–1994)
He started his career at Norwich City, initially as a centre-half before being converted into a striker by manager Dave Stringer. He made his debut on 4 May 1991 in a 1–0 home win over Queens Park Rangers in the First Division.

In Stringer's final season as manager, 1991–92, Norwich were FA Cup semi-finalists and Sutton gradually broke into the first team. Sutton made 21 league appearances that season, scoring twice.

He quickly found success in his new position as Norwich spent most of the first season of the new FA Premier League, 1992–93, as league leaders, before eventually slipping back to third place under new manager Mike Walker. Sutton featured in 38 Premier League games that season, scoring eight goals – making him the club's second highest scorer behind Mark Robins.

In the autumn of 1993, he was part of the Norwich side which famously eliminated Bayern Munich from the UEFA Cup. He scored 25 Premier League goals that season, but after Walker defected to Everton in January to be succeeded by assistant John Deehan, Norwich slipped out of the top five and finished a disappointing 12th in the final table.

By now, Sutton was being linked with some of the biggest clubs in the country, including Blackburn Rovers, Arsenal and Manchester United.

Blackburn Rovers (1994–1999)
Sutton became the most expensive player in English football in July 1994, when he was transferred from Norwich City to Blackburn Rovers for £5 million.
In his first season at Ewood Park he developed a strong partnership (known as 'SAS') with Alan Shearer and scored fifteen Premier League goals to help secure the club's first league title since 1914.

A succession of injuries, combined with a loss of form, saw him make just 13 Premier League appearances during 1995–96 and fail to score a single league goal. Shearer's regular strike partner that season was Mike Newell, but at the end of the season both Shearer and Newell left the club, leaving Sutton and Kevin Gallacher as Blackburn's only major strikers.

He regained his form over the next three seasons and was the joint highest goalscorer in the Premier League in 1997–98, scoring 18 times.

Sutton was involved in a controversial moment towards the end of the 1996–97 season in a league game against Arsenal at Highbury. Late in the game with The Gunners leading by a single goal, the ball was kicked out of play by Arsenal to allow an injured teammate to receive treatment. Under the unwritten sportsmanship rule, Arsenal would expect the ball to be returned to them unhindered. However, Sutton chased the ball instead of allowing it to be thrown back to Arsenal and won a corner from his efforts, from which Blackburn scored. At the end of the season, Arsenal missed out on a lucrative place in the Champions League to Newcastle United on goal difference. Following the incident Blackburn's interim manager Tony Parkes described Sutton as "a boy who was sometimes a bit dizzy ... a bit silly", stating "It was against the spirit of the game and he should not have done it". Sutton refused to apologise for his actions.

Although Sutton's 18 goals helped Blackburn finish sixth and qualify for the UEFA Cup in 1998, he managed just 17 league games and 3 goals the following season as they were relegated from the Premier League at the end of 1998–99, just four years after being crowned champions. His absences were the result of a series of injuries. Most notably, he was absent for the penultimate game of the season on 12 May 1999, which Blackburn had to win to keep their survival hopes alive. They could only manage a goalless draw at home to Manchester United, who went on to win the title four days later.

Chelsea (1999–2000)
Sutton was sold to Chelsea for £10 million after Blackburn's relegation. His time at Stamford Bridge proved an unhappy one, as he struggled both to live up to the price tag and to adapt to Chelsea's style of play, scoring just one league goal in a 5–0 win against Manchester United in 28 appearances, and three goals in total, the other two coming against Skonto Riga in a Champions League qualifier, and Hull City in the FA Cup. He failed to even make the bench for the club's FA Cup Final win against Aston Villa, and was sold to Scottish Premier League side Celtic for £6 million in the summer of 2000.

Celtic (2000–2006)
After his disappointing season at Chelsea, Sutton quickly regained his goal-scoring form at Celtic. Sutton scored the winner on his league debut in a 2–1 win against Dundee United in July 2000, but was then sent off in his second appearance against Motherwell. Sutton endeared himself to Celtic fans four weeks later in his first Old Firm match against Rangers – scoring the first and last goals in a dramatic 6–2 victory for Celtic. Sutton went on to form a prolific partnership with Swede Henrik Larsson.

Sutton's goals helped Celtic win three SPL titles, three Scottish Cups and one Scottish League Cup, as well as reaching a UEFA Cup final. Indeed, many of Sutton's most memorable goals for Celtic were scored in European competition; Ajax away in 2001, Juventus at Celtic Park the same year, goals away at Blackburn Rovers and VfB Stuttgart during the UEFA Cup run to the final in Seville in 2003, and also a thumping volley from close range against Barcelona at Celtic Park in 2004. Sutton also holds the record for the quickest goal ever in an Old Firm Clash, scored at Ibrox in 2002, scoring inside just 18 seconds.

Sutton's acerbic nature came to the fore again at the end of the 2002–03 season when he accused Dunfermline Athletic of "lying down", in order for Celtic to lose the title. He failed to apologise and was charged with bringing the game into disrepute, and received a one-match ban to add to the four-match suspension he was serving for abusing match officials on the same day.

His best season at Celtic was arguably the 2003–04 season, when he scored 19 SPL goals. and was voted SPFA Player of the Year. Indeed, as 2003–04 drew to a conclusion, a superbly struck injury time winner by Sutton against Rangers at Celtic Park gave his side a clean sweep of victories against their old rivals that season (4 league wins and 1 Scottish Cup win).

In his five and half years at Celtic, Sutton showed his versatility on many occasions. Although considered primarily a striker, Sutton was often deployed in central midfield to allow Welsh striker John Hartson – another robust forward – to play up front alongside Larsson. On occasion Sutton was fielded in his original position of centre-half, notably against Rangers in a league game on 4 October 2003. Celtic won 1–0, with Sutton turning in an assured performance in defence.

As Gordon Strachan took up the reins of managing Celtic in 2005–06, Sutton's appearances for Celtic became more sporadic. With doubts about his fitness and rumours of a fractious relationship with Strachan, it was little surprise when Sutton departed from Celtic on a free transfer in January 2006.

Birmingham City (2006)
He joined Premier League club Birmingham City on a free transfer in January 2006, but injuries restricted him to just eleven appearances, scoring once in the derby defeat to Aston Villa in mid-April. One of a number of players on high wages subjected to criticism by club owner David Sullivan, Sutton was released at the end of the season following Birmingham's relegation to the Championship.

Aston Villa (2006–2007)
Sutton signed for Aston Villa in October 2006, until the end of the 2006–07 season, where he linked up with former Celtic boss Martin O'Neill. Sutton scored his first goal for the club with the winner against Everton in November 2006.

However, in a game against Manchester United in December 2006, he suffered blurred vision and, despite having visited several specialists, did not recover. O'Neill said, "Chris has got a genuine concern. No-one can give him any guarantees about what might be the consequences if he got cracked on the head again. Whatever eyesight Chris has now, he would obviously want to keep, so he must bear that in mind when deciding his whole future and career." On 5 July 2007, Sutton retired from football due to the eye injury.

Wroxham (2012)
In October 2012, Sutton made a surprise return to football with Isthmian League Division One North club Wroxham. He made his debut for The Yachtsmen on 6 October 2012 against Tilbury, coming on in the 63rd minute, after his goalkeeper son Oliver had been substituted on for the Norfolk side in the first half.

International career
Sutton's form for Blackburn won him an England cap on 15 November 1997, when he came on in the 79th minute against Cameroon, although he was left out of the World Cup squad after a fall-out with national manager Glenn Hoddle. Having been relegated to the England B team Sutton refused to play, and Hoddle never selected Sutton for an England squad again.

Management career

Lincoln City
Sutton was interviewed in January 2009 by Inverness Caledonian Thistle for the post of manager, but was unsuccessful. On 28 September 2009, Sutton was appointed manager of League Two side Lincoln City, succeeding Peter Jackson who was dismissed earlier in the month. Despite having no managerial experience, Sutton was preferred to more than 70 other applicants. Caretaker manager Simon Clark would take charge of the following day's game, with Sutton and assistant Ian Pearce to take over the day after.

His first game as manager came at Sincil Bank against Aldershot Town on 3 October 2009. Lincoln were victorious through a second half Sergio Torres goal to give Sutton a winning start in management. Sutton took Lincoln to the FA Cup third round for the first time since 1999, but lost 4–0 to Premier League outfit Bolton Wanderers. Football League survival was confirmed on 24 April 2010 when Sutton guided the Imps to a 1–0 victory over promotion-chasing Bury at Sincil Bank, with two games remaining. Sutton left his post as Lincoln manager on 29 September due to family reasons.

Media career
Sutton acts as the main co-commentator, including on all of Celtic FC's UEFA Champions League games, alongside either Rob MacLean or Rory Hamilton. He also appears on BT Sport Score most Saturday afternoons alongside Mark Pougatch and Robbie Savage. Sutton also works as a pundit for BBC Radio 5 Live and BBC Sport. In January 2015 he attracted criticism for saying that Celtic's Scottish League Cup semi-final against Rangers would be "so one-sided" that Celtic "could win it blindfolded".

Personal life
Sutton was born in Nottingham, the son of Mike Sutton, formerly a footballer with Norwich City. His younger brother John also became a footballer, and has played for a number of clubs in both England and Scotland. As a child he moved from East Leake in Nottinghamshire to Horsford in Norfolk.

As of February 2007, Sutton was married with five children.

After retiring from football, Sutton remained an athlete, playing cricket for Norwich Cricket Club in the EAPL.

In July 2000, Sutton was convicted of two charges of common assault and fined £300 plus costs after an incident outside a restaurant in which he spat in the face of another man.

In February 2022 Sutton and Micah Richards spoke about mental health issues in their playing days.

Career statistics

Club

Managerial

Honours
Blackburn Rovers
 Premier League: 1994–95

Celtic
 Scottish Premier League: 2000–01, 2001–02, 2003–04, 2005–06
 Scottish Cup: 2000–01, 2003–04, 2004–05; runner-up: 2001–02
 Scottish League Cup: 2000–01; runner-up: 2002–03
 UEFA Cup runner-up: 2002–03

England U21
 Toulon Tournament: 1993

Individual
 Premier League Golden Boot: 1997–98
 Premier League Player of the Month: November 1994, February 1998
 Norwich City Player of the Season: 1993–94
 PFA Scotland Players' Player of the Year: 2003–04
 PFA Team of the Year: 1994–95 Premier League
 Scottish Premier League Player of the Month: November 2003, January 2005

See also
 Norwich City F.C. Hall of Fame

References

External links
 
 
 Profile at premierleague.com
 Photos and stats at sporting-heroes.net
 Career information at ex-canaries.co.uk
 Sutton's playing career in pictures at BBC Sport
 

1973 births
Living people
People from Horsford
People from East Leake
Footballers from Nottinghamshire
Footballers from Nottingham
Association football forwards
Association football utility players
English footballers
England under-21 international footballers
England B international footballers
England international footballers
Norwich City F.C. players
Blackburn Rovers F.C. players
Chelsea F.C. players
Celtic F.C. players
Birmingham City F.C. players
Aston Villa F.C. players
Wroxham F.C. players
English Football League players
Premier League players
First Division/Premier League top scorers
Scottish Premier League players
English football managers
Lincoln City F.C. managers
English Football League managers